Night Rider is the first novel by American author Robert Penn Warren. It was published in the United States in 1939.

The book's main character, Percy Munn, is a young lawyer involved in a fictionalized version of the Black Patch Tobacco Wars, which took place in Kentucky and Tennessee in the early years of the twentieth century.

References

External links
 Ralph Thompson, "Review of Night Rider", Books of the Times, March 14, 1939. Retrieved on 2008-01-07.

Novels by Robert Penn Warren
1939 American novels
Fiction set in the 1900s
Houghton Mifflin books
Novels set in Kentucky
Novels set in Tennessee
Works about the tobacco industry
1939 debut novels